La Managua Airport  is an airport approximately  east of the Pacific coastal city of Quepos, Costa Rica, serving this city as well as the Manuel Antonio National Park and other tourist attractions in the central part of Puntarenas Province. The airport is named for the La Managua barrio where it is located. The airport is owned and managed by the country's Directorate General of Civil Aviation (DGAC).

Airlines and destinations

Passenger statistics

La Managua Airport is the fourth-busiest in the country by passenger traffic and the second-busiest domestic-only airport after Puerto Jiménez Airport. These data show number of passengers movements into the airport, according to the Directorate General of Civil Aviation of Costa Rica's Statistical Yearbooks.

See also
 Transport in Costa Rica
 List of airports in Costa Rica

References

External links
OurAirports - Quepos La Managua Airport

Airports in Costa Rica
Buildings and structures in Puntarenas Province